Field School can mean:

Field school, mentored field research
Farmer field school, an international farm-education program

It can also refer to schools with the name "Field" in them:

The Field School, a college-preparatory school in Washington, D.C., United States
Field High School, a public high school near Mogadore, Ohio, United States
Field Elementary School in Field, British Columbia, Canada
Field Elementary School (Massachusetts), an elementary school in Weston, Massachusetts, United States